Yoslan Muñoz Garcia (born February 9, 1980) is a Cuban volleyball player.

She competed with the Cuba women's national volleyball team at the 2002 FIVB Volleyball Women's World Championship in Germany, and the 2002 FIVB Volleyball World Grand Prix. She played for club team Ciudad Habana.

References 

1980 births
Living people
Cuban women's volleyball players